Ovidiu Alexandru Bic (born 23 February 1994) is a Romanian professional footballer who plays as a midfielder for Liga I club Universitatea Cluj.

Club career
On 5 January 2018, Bic signed a four-and-a-half-year contract with CS Universitatea Craiova.

Honours

Gaz Metan Mediaș
Liga II: 2015–16

Universitatea Craiova
Cupa României: 2017–18, 2020–21
Supercupa României: 2021

References

External links
 
 

1994 births
Living people
People from Abrud
Romanian footballers
Association football midfielders
Romania youth international footballers
Liga I players
Liga II players
Israeli Premier League players
CF Liberty Oradea players
FC Bihor Oradea players
FC Olimpia Satu Mare players
CS Gaz Metan Mediaș players
CS Universitatea Craiova players
AFC Chindia Târgoviște players
Hapoel Ironi Kiryat Shmona F.C. players
FC Universitatea Cluj players
Romanian expatriate footballers
Expatriate footballers in Israel
Romanian expatriate sportspeople in Israel